Yukina Hayashi (林有紀奈 Hayashi Yukina, born March 23, 1996) is a Japanese volleyball player who plays for Toray Arrows.

Clubs
  Shimokitazawa Seitoku high school
  Toray Arrows (2014-)

External links
 Toray Arrows Women's Volleyball Team

1996 births
Living people
Japanese women's volleyball players
People from Tokyo